The 1948 Boston University Terriers football team was an American football team that represented Boston University as an independent during the 1948 college football season. In its second season under head coach Aldo Donelli, the team compiled a 6–2 record and outscored their opponents by a total of 127 to 102.

Schedule

References

Boston University
Boston University Terriers football seasons
Boston University Terriers football